The Telugu Filmfare Best Male Playback Award is given by the Filmfare magazine as part of its annual Filmfare Awards for Telugu films. The award was first given in 1997.

Superlatives
Karthik holds the record of maximum win in this category with three.

Winners

Here is a list of the award winners and the films for which they won.

Nominations

2005: Shankar Mahadevan – "Chandrullo Unde" – Nuvvostanante Nenoddantana
Karthik – "Pilichina" – Athadu
M. M. Keeravani – "Trisha Achata Ichata" – Allari Bullodu
S. P. Balasubrahmanyam – "Ghal Ghal Ghal Ghal" – Nuvvostanante Nenoddantana
Tippu – "Something Something" – Nuvvostanante Nenoddantana
2006: S. P. Balasubrahmanyam – "Adigo Bhadradri" – Sri Ramadasu
Chakri – "Nuvvantene Ishtam" – Devadasu
Nihal – "Gala Gala" – Pokiri
Sagar – "Jabilammavo" – Bunny
Siddharth – "Apudo Ipudo" – Bommarillu
2008: Karthik – "Nijangaa Nenenaa" – Kotha Bangaru Lokam
 N. C. Karunya – "Andamaina Kalala" – Baladur
 Ranjith – "Entavaraku" – Gamyam
 S. P. Balasubrahmanyam – "Matrudevobhava" – Pandurangadu
 Saketh – "Nammavemo Ganee" – Parugu
2009: Anuj Gurwara – "Panchadara Bomma" – Magadheera
 Baba Sehgal – "Mr. Perfect" – Arya 2
 Kailash Kher – "Kammukunna Cheekatlona" – Arundhati
 S. P. Balasubrahmanyam – "Indiramma" – Mahatma
 Shankar Mahadevan – "Konchem Ishtam" – Konchem Ishtam Konchem Kashtam
2010: Ramesh Vinayagam & N. C. Karunya – "Sada Shiva Sanyasi" – Khaleja
 Hariharan – "Bangaru Konda" – Simha
 Karthik – "Nijamena" – Brindaavanam
 Naresh Iyer – "Nenu Nuvvantu" – Orange
 Vijay Prakash – "Ee Hrudayam" – Ye Maaya Chesave
2011: Rahul Nambiar – "Guruvaram March Okati" – Dookudu
 Karthik – "Champakamala" – Kandireega
 Hemachandra – "Oka Vithanam" – Golconda High School
 Tippu – "Kalaya Nijama" – Sri Rama Rajyam
 Vijay Prakash – "Niharika" – Oosaravelli
2012: Vaddepalli Srinivas – "Gannulanti Kannulunna" – Gabbar Singh
 Adnan Sami – "O Madhu" – Julayi
 Deepu – "Nene Nani E" – Eega
 Karthik – "Yevvaro" – Boduguard
 S. P. Balasubrahmanyam – "Krishnam Vande Jagadgurum" – Krishnam Vande Jagadgurum
2013: Kailash Kher – "Pandagala Digivachavu" – Mirchi 
 Daler Mehndi – "Banthi Poola Janaki" – Baadshah
 Ranjith – "Jabilli Nuvve Cheppamma" – Ramayya Vasthavayya
 Shankar Mahadevan – "Bapu Gari Bomma" – Atharintiki Daaredi
 Suchith Suresan – "Meenakshi Meenakshi" – Masala
2014: Simha – "Cinema Choopista" – Race Gurram
 Arijit Singh – "Kanulanu Thake" – Manam
 Haricharan – "Saripovu Koti" – Karthikeya
 Hariharan – "Neelirangu" – Govindudu Andarivadele
 Hemachandra – "Intakante" – Oohalu Gusagusalade
2015: M. L. R. Karthikeyan – "Pora Srimanthuda" – Srimanthudu
 Dhanunjay – "Bhaje Bhaje" – Gopala Gopala
 Keerthi Sagathia – "Neeku Theliyanida" – Kanche
 Yazin Nizar – "Meghalu Lekunna" – Kumari 21F
 Yazin Nizar – "Charusheela" – Srimanthudu
2016: Karthik – "Yellipoke Shyamala" from A Aa
 Dhanunjay – "You Are My MLA" – Sarrainodu
 NTR Jr. – "Follow Follow" – Nannaku Prematho
 Shankar Mahadevan – "Oka Laalana" – Jyo Achyutananda
 Vijay Prakash – "Thanu Nenu" – Sahasam Swasaga Sagipo
2017: Hemachandra – "Oosupodhu" – Fidaa
 Anurag Kulkarni – "Mellaga Tellarindoi" – Sathamanam Bhavati
 Armaan Malik – "Hello" – Hello
 LV Revanth – "Teliseney Na Nuvvey" – Arjun Reddy
 Sid Sriram – "Adiga Adiga" – Ninnu Kori
2018: Sid Sriram – "Inkem Inkem Kavaali" – Geetha Govindam
 Armaan Malik – "Ninnila Ninnila" – Tholi Prema
 Anurag Kulkarni – "Aasha Paasham" – C/o Kancharapalem
 Anurag Kulkarni – "Pillaa Raa" – RX 100
 Kaala Bhairava – "Peniviti" – Aravinda Sametha Veera Raghava
 Rahul Sipligunj – "Rangaa Rangaa Rangasthalaana" – Rangasthalam
2020–2021: Sid Sriram – "Srivalli" – Pushpa:  The Rise
Anurag Kulkarni – "Ramuloo Ramulaa" – Ala Vaikunthapurramuloo
Anurag Kulkarni – "Sirivennala" – Shyam Singha Roy
Armaan Malik – "Butta Bomma" – Ala Vaikunthapurramuloo
Ram Miriyala – "Chitti" – Jathi Ratnalu
Sid Sriram – "Samajavaragamana" – Ala Vaikunthapurramuloo
Sid Sriram – "Manasa Manasa" – Most Eligible Bachelor
Sid Sriram – "Maguva Maguva" – Vakeel Saab

References

Male playback
Indian music awards